Lin Yi (born January 11, 1999) is a Chinese actor and model. He gained popularity after starring in the 2019 romantic web drama Put Your Head on My Shoulder, which brought him wider recognition.

Early life and education
Lin Yi was born in Hebei Province and grew up in Shenyang City, Liaoning Province. In 2015, he was admitted to the National Ballroom Dance major of Beijing Sport University and received the top score in the unified examination of dance majors in Liaoning Province.

Career

2015–2018: Career beginnings 
In 2015, Lin was still in the first year, when he was discovered by the agent and signed with Tangren Media Co. Ltd. In 2016, during summer vacation, he went abroad to receive professional dance and performance training. In 2017, he participated in the casting activity of the youth campus network drama "Hello, Old Times", and auditioned for the leading actor Lin Yang, but was ultimately unsuccessful.

On May 14, 2017, he participated as a cast member in Youku idol reality show Handsome Youth Society. In June 2017, Lin Yi's performance in the "Beautiful Boys Academy" program was remarkable. During the "Beautiful Boys Academy" program's acting class, Lin Yi restored the clip of "Old Pao'er" the movie that Feng Xiaogang shot. They staged a classic scene of "Old Pao'er" together. After the acting class, Director Feng recognize Lin Yi's acting's skill. And said Lin Yi will become a good actor. On November 7, 2017, he was a contestant in Youku fashion variety show Crazy Wardrobe and won the 6th championship with 41 votes. In December 2017, he was confirmed to make his big screen debut in the sci-fi film Hope Island, with Duan Yihong and Andy García.

2019–present: Rising popularity 

In 2019, Lin started to gain increased attention and popularity with his role as Gu Weiyi in the romantic comedy web drama Put Your Head on My Shoulder based on Zhao Qianqian's novel of the same name. The drama was a success and hit in China and overseas (Thailand) where it achieved a cult following. Lin received positive reviews for his portrayal of Gu Weiyi which led to increased popularity for him. On 20 May 2019, Lin Yi and co-star Xing Fei held a grand fan meeting in Bangkok, Thailand, where a huge crowd of thousands fans gathered. Lin appeared in Harper's Bazaar Hong Kong in the May issue.

In 2019, he was nominated for the Best Actor Award for Chinese Contemporary TV Dramas at the 26th Huading Awards China Top 100 TV Drama Satisfaction Survey Awards Ceremony with the TV series "To Our Warm Hour"; in the same year, he also won the Starlight Awards Annual Youth Trending Artist Award, and the Golden Guduo Network Film and Television Festival Annual New Actor Award.

In 2020, Lin starred in the costume fantasy drama "Linglong"; in the same year, he starred in the urban emotional drama "Memory of Encaustic Tile".

On October 1, 2020, the song "My Motherland", a tribute to the 71st anniversary of the founding of the People's Republic of China, sung together with many artists, was released.

On January 29, 2021, the costume adventure fantasy drama "Ling Long" starring Zhao Jinmai and Yuan Hong was launched, and he played the aspiring young monarch Yuan Yi in the play. In April, he starred in the youth inspirational light comedy "Love Scenery" with Xu Lu, and played the e-sports anchor Lu Jing in the play. As a member of the Brotherhood, he joined the Zhejiang Satellite TV variety show "Let's Run, the Second Season of the Yellow River". On December 27, he was selected into the 2021 Film Channel "Star Ocean" Young Actor Selection Program.

On January 26, 2022, the urban emotional drama "Memory of Encaustic Tile" was broadcast on Youku, in which he played the role of Zheng Su Nian. On April 2, the movie "One Week Friends" starring Zhao Jinmai and Shen Yue was released, and he played Xu Youshu in the film.

Filmography

Film

Television

Variety show

Discography

Awards and nominations

References

External links
 
 

Chinese male television actors
21st-century Chinese male actors
1999 births
Living people
Male actors from Hebei